Oceanside is a census-designated place (CDP) and unincorporated community in Tillamook County, Oregon, United States. The population was 361 at the 2010 census. Oregon Route 131's northern terminus is in the community, which is just north of Netarts. Symons State Park is in Oceanside, while Three Arch Rocks National Wildlife Refuge lies just offshore.

Geography
Oceanside is located at  (45.459022, -123.966014).

Demographics

As of the census of 2000, there were 326 people, 193 households, and 99 families residing in the CDP. The population density was 327.1 people per square mile (125.9/km2). There were 522 housing units at an average density of 523.7 per square mile (201.5/km2). The racial makeup of the CDP was 96.63% White, 0.61% African American, 1.84% Asian, and 0.92% from two or more races. Hispanic or Latino of any race were 1.23% of the population.

There were 193 households, out of which 5.2% had children under the age of 18 living with them, 48.7% were married couples living together, 2.1% had a female householder with no husband present, and 48.2% were non-families. 41.5% of all households were made up of individuals, and 14.0% had someone living alone who was 65 years of age or older. The average household size was 1.69 and the average family size was 2.20.

In the CDP, the population was spread out, with 4.9% under the age of 18, 2.1% from 18 to 24, 16.9% from 25 to 44, 42.0% from 45 to 64, and 34.0% who were 65 years of age or older. The median age was 57 years. For every 100 females, there were 100.0 males. For every 100 females age 18 and over, there were 101.3 males.

The median income for a household in the CDP was $40,708, and the median income for a family was $51,750. Males had a median income of $37,273 versus $28,472 for females. The per capita income for the CDP was $32,158. None of the families and 6.8% of the population were living below the poverty line, including no under eighteens and none of those over 64.

See also
Oceanside Beach State Recreation Site

References

Census-designated places in Oregon
Census-designated places in Tillamook County, Oregon
Populated coastal places in Oregon
Unincorporated communities in Oregon
Unincorporated communities in Tillamook County, Oregon